The National Union PSD+PUR was an electoral alliance in Romania in 2004.

History
The alliance was formed between the Social Democratic Party (PSD) and the Humanist Party of Romania (PUR) as a counterpart to the Justice and Truth Alliance (DA; PNL-PD), only for the 2004 legislative elections and Romanian presidential election.

The two parties - by then PSD and Conservative Party (PC) - also decided to form a political alliance for the 2008 general elections, called Alliance PSD+PC, reflecting the Humanist Party's change of name.

Electoral history

Legislative elections 

Notes:

1 National Union PSD+PUR members: PSD (46 senators and 113 deputies) and PUR (11 senators and 19 deputies).

2 Soon after the elections, PUR broke the alliance and switched sides, joining Justice and Truth Alliance (DA).

3 Alliance PSD+PC members: PSD (48 senators and 110 deputies) and PC (1 senator and 4 deputies).

Presidential elections

References 

Defunct political party alliances in Romania